The Durg–Jaipur Weekly Express is an Express train belonging to South East Central Railway zone that runs between  and  in India. It is currently being operated with 18213/18214 train numbers on a weekly basis.

Service

The 18213/Durg–Jaipur Weekly Express has an average speed of 54 km/hr and covers 1262 km in 23h 20m. The 18214/Jaipur–Durg Weekly Express has an average speed of 51 km/hr and covers 1262 km in 24h 35m.

Route and halts 

The important halts of the train are:

Coach composition

The train has standard ICF rakes with a max speed of 110 kmph. The train consists of 21 coaches:

 1 First AC 
 2 AC II Tier
 2 AC III Tier
 8 Sleeper coaches
 6 General Unreserved
 2 Seating cum Luggage Rake

Traction

Both trains are hauled by a Ghaziabad Loco Shed-based WAM-4 electric locomotive from Durg to Sawai Madhopur Junction. From Sawai Madhopur Junction, trains are hauled by a Bhagat Ki Kothi Loco Shed-based WDP-4D diesel locomotive uptil Jaipur.

Rake sharing

The train shares its rake with 18215/18216 Durg–Jammu Tawi Express.

Direction reversal

The train reverses its direction 2 times:

See also 

 Durg Junction railway station
 Jaipur Junction railway station
 Durg–Jammu Tawi Express

Notes

References

External links 

 18213/Durg–Jaipur Weekly Express India Rail Info
 18214/Jaipur–Durg Weekly Express India Rail Info

Transport in Durg
Transport in Jaipur
Express trains in India
Rail transport in Chhattisgarh
Rail transport in Madhya Pradesh
Rail transport in Rajasthan
Railway services introduced in 2014